The Slovenia Open is a senior international figure skating competition. It is held early in the season in Celje, Slovenia. Medals are awarded in the disciplines of men's and ladies' singles.

Senior medalists

Men

Ladies

References

External links 
 Slovene Skating Union

Figure skating competitions
International figure skating competitions hosted by Slovenia